List of North American countries by GDP per capita may refer to:

 List of North American countries by GDP (PPP) per capita
 List of North American countries by GDP (nominal) per capita